Paul Quinn (born 18 April 1972) is an Australian former professional rugby league footballer who played for Parramatta, Penrith and South Sydney in the 1990s.

A St Gregory's College product, Quinn earned Australian schoolboys representative selection in 1990 and was signed by Parramatta in what was reported to be one of the most lucrative contracts ever offered to a schoolboy player.

Quinn, a back rower, was unable to establish himself in Parramatta's first-grade team, with most of his appearances coming off the bench, and crossed to Penrith for the 1993 NSWRL season.

In 1994 he joined South Sydney and was a member of the team which upset the Brisbane Broncos to win the Challenge Cup in the 1994 pre season. His 1994 season was ultimately cruelled by a knee injury, but he made regular appearances in 1995 as a second rower and again in 1996, mostly at lock.

References

External links
Paul Quinn at Rugby League project

1972 births
Living people
Australian rugby league players
Rugby league locks
Rugby league second-rows
Parramatta Eels players
South Sydney Rabbitohs players
Penrith Panthers players